Biathlon at the 1960 Winter Olympics consisted of one biathlon event, held at McKinney Creek Stadium, Tahoma, California. The event occurred on 21 February 1960. This was the first appearance of modern biathlon in the Olympic Games. In 1924, a military patrol event was held. Some sources do not include this military patrol race as an Olympic event, but the IOC considers it an event within biathlon.

Medal summary

Klas Lestander of Sweden won the first modern biathlon Olympic gold medal.

Medal table

Events

Participating nations
Nine nations sent biathletes to compete in Squaw Valley. Below is a list of the competing nations; in parentheses are the number of national competitors.

References

External links

1960 Squaw Valley Official Olympic Report
1960 Olympic Nordic Events

 
1960
1960 Winter Olympics events
1960 in biathlon
Sports in Tahoma, California
Biathlon competitions in the United States